This is a list of dramatic television series (including web television and miniseries) that premiered in the 2020s which feature lesbian, gay, bisexual, and transgender characters. Non-binary, pansexual, asexual, and graysexual characters are also included. The orientation can be portrayed on-screen, described in the dialogue or mentioned.

2020

2021

2022

2023

See also

 List of fictional asexual characters
 List of fictional intersex characters
 List of fictional non-binary characters
 List of fictional pansexual characters
 List of animated series with LGBTQ+ characters
 List of comedy television series with LGBT characters
 List of horror television series with LGBT characters
 List of made-for-television films with LGBT characters
 List of news and information television programs featuring LGBT subjects
 List of reality television programs with LGBT cast members
 List of LGBT characters in radio and podcasts
 List of LGBT characters in soap operas

References

Further reading
 
 
 
 
 
 
 GLAAD Primetime Television Season Report:

Dramatic television series 2020s
Dramatic
drama
LGBT characters in dramatic television